Kumarahou is a Maori designation for various species of shrub. It may refer to:

Olearia colensoi
Pomaderris kumeraho